Tolidostena is a subgenus of beetles in the family Mordellidae, containing the following species:

Tolidostena atripennis Nakane, 1956
Tolidostena ermischi Nakane, 1956
Tolidostena fusei (Tokeji)
Tolidostena japonica (Tokeji, 1953)
Tolidostena montana Kiyoyama, 1991
Tolidostena similator Kiyoyama, 1991
Tolidostena tarsalis Ermisch, 1942

References

Mordellidae
Insect subgenera